Achmat Hassiem (born 6 May 1982) is a South African swimmer who was injured in an attack by a great white shark. He competed at the 2008 Summer Paralympics and he competed at the 2012 Summer Paralympics in London.

Personal life
Hassiem was born on 6 May 1982 in Cape Town, Western Cape, South Africa. He attended Bergvliet High School in Bergvliet, a suburb of Cape Town.

In 2006 his right leg was severed by a four-and-a-half metre long great white shark whilst he was training for lifesaving exams at Muizenberg beach with his brother Tariq; the lower portion of his leg was subsequently amputated. Because of the manner in which he sustained his disability Hassiem is nicknamed "Sharkboy".

Swimming
Hassiem began swimming at the Sports Science Institute of South Africa following his accident. For competition he is categorised in the S10 classification, the classification for swimmers with the most physical ability. He is coached by Brian Button.

He first competed internationally for South Africa at the 2008 Summer Paralympics held in Beijing, People's Republic of China. He swam in the men's 100 metre backstroke S10 event finishing sixth in his heat in a time of one minute 1.61 seconds and failing to make the final.

He was selected to represent South Africa at the 2012 Summer Paralympics held in London, where he competed in the 100 metres butterfly and the 100 and 400 metres freestyle events. Swimming events at the Games were held from 30 August to 8 September at the London Aquatics Centre in the Olympic Park. On 1 September 2012 Hassiem won a bronze medal in the 100 m butterfly, setting a new African record of 57.76 seconds in the final.

References

External links 
 

Living people
1982 births
Sportspeople from Cape Town
Paralympic swimmers of South Africa
Swimmers at the 2008 Summer Paralympics
Swimmers at the 2012 Summer Paralympics
Swimmers at the 2016 Summer Paralympics
South African male swimmers
Paralympic bronze medalists for South Africa
Medalists at the 2012 Summer Paralympics
S10-classified Paralympic swimmers
African Games gold medalists for South Africa
African Games medalists in swimming
African Games silver medalists for South Africa
Competitors at the 2011 All-Africa Games
Shark attack victims
20th-century South African people
21st-century South African people